Neill Gorton (born 6 September 1969) is an English special effects artist, visual effects specialist and make-up artist specialised in animatronics and prosthetics. He is known for his work on films like Saving Private Ryan (1998) and Children of Men (2006) and the series Doctor Who (2005).

Career

Gorton entered the film industry already at the age of 17. Early on, he started to work for Hollywood film productions in co-operation with directors like Steven Spielberg and Alfonso Cuarón and actors such as Johnny Depp, Michael Caine and Christopher Lee.  He is responsible the design of most Doctor Who villains and monsters, including the modern update of Davros. He won the BAFTA Awards four times with six nominations and won the RTS Awards two times with five nominations. He was nominated one time for the OFTA awards. Gorton and Rob Mayor are the directors of the company Millennium FX, which is focused on cutting edge prosthetics, animatronics, and special make-up FX. He is also the director of Gorton Studio, which offers courses for trainees up to professionals in screen prosthetics. He is also a visiting professor at the University of Bolton.

Filmography

Film
The Unholy (1988)
The Lair of the White Worm (1988)
Hellbound: Hellraiser II (1988)
Nightbreed (1990)
Revenge of Billy the Kid (1992)
Funny Man (1994)
Judge Dredd (1995)
Saving Private Ryan (1998)
Alice in Wonderland (1999)
The Calling (2000)
Flex (2000)
Les âmes fortes (2001)
The Last Minute (2001)
From Hell (2001)
Cruise of the Gods (2002)
24 Hour Party People (2002)
Close Your Eyes (2002)
This Little Life (2003)
Lara Croft Tomb Raider: The Cradle of Life (2003)
The Actors (2003)
The League of Extraordinary Gentlemen (2003)
The Order (2003)
Five Children and It (2004)
Enduring Love (2004)
Gender Swap (Documentary, 2004))
Rubber Johnny (Short film, 2005)
Sahara (2005)
The Walk (2005)
Children of Men (2006)
Longford (2006)
Severance (2006)
Wishbaby (2007)
Frankenstein (2007)
Flawless (2007)
Becoming Jane (2007)
Phoo Action (2008)
Inkheart (2008)
The Brothers Bloom (2008)
The Oxford Murders (2008)
The Color of Magic (2008)
Vampire Killers (2009)

Cha'mone Mo'Fo'Selecta! A Tribute to Michael Jackson (2009)
The Fattest Man in Britain (2009)
The Wolfman (2010)
Dead Cert (2010)
Thor (2011)
The Girl (2012)
Chernobyl Diaries (2012)
Yamla Pagla Deewana 2 (2013)
One Direction: This Is Us (Documentary, 2013)
Les Dawson: An Audience with That Never Was (Documentary, 2013)
The Harry Hill Movie (2013)
Frankenstein (2015)

Television
Space Precinct (1994)
The 10th Kingdom (5 episodes, 2000)
Dr. Terrible's House of Horrible (2 episodes, 2001)
The Infinite Worlds of H.G. Wells (2001)
Ant & Dec's Saturday Night Takeaway (2002)
Strange (2003)
Little Britain (14 episodes, 2003–2004)
Silent Witness (12 episodes, 2003–2004)
Messiah: The Promise (2004)
Hex (3 episodes, 2005)
Help (2005)
The Virgin Queen (6 episodes, 2005)
Bodies (1 episode, 2005)
Doctor Who (52 episodes, 2006 – 2013)
Jackanory (1 episode, 2006)
The Sarah Jane Adventures (35 episodes, 2007–2009)
Jekyll (6 episodes, 2007)
Being Human (14 episodes, 2008–2010)
Torchwood (8 episodes, 2009)
Any Human Heart (TV series) (4 episodes, 2010)
Bellamy's People (8 episodes, 2010)
Wizards vs. Aliens (18 episodes, 2012–2014)
Fool Britannia (6 episodes, 2013)
Spotless (1 episode, 2014)
The Smoke (1 episode, 2014)
Ludus (1 episode, 2014)
My Wild Affair: Aisha (1 episode, 2014)

Awards

British Academy Film Awards

BAFTA Awards, Wales

Royal Television Society, UK

Online Film and Television Association

References

1969 births
Living people
British make-up artists
Film people from Liverpool
Academics of the University of Bolton